Sofia Rotaru poёt pesni Vladimira Ivasyuka (literally: Sofia Rotaru Performs Songs of Volodymyr Ivasyuk) - is a studio album of Sofia Rotaru, recorded at Melodiya in the USSR in 1978. Sofia Rotaru was awarded the grand prix of the Central Committee of Komsomol for this album, which became the reference in Ukrainian pop culture.
Russian title: Sofia Rotaru poёt pesni Vladimira Ivasyuka
Ukrainian title: Pisni Volodimira Ivasyuka spivae Sofia Rotaru

Track listing

Languages of performance 

All the songs are performed in Ukrainian language.

References

External links 

1978 albums
Sofia Rotaru albums